Skagit Transit is a public transit system in Skagit County, Washington, US. It operates 17 bus routes, as well as paratransit and vanpool services across the entire county. The agency was founded in 1993 and is funded by a 0.4 percent local sales tax.

History

The Skagit County public transportation benefit area, funded by a 0.2 percent sales tax, was approved by voters in Mount Vernon and Burlington in November 1992. Bus service began on November 3, 1993, with a network of four routes serving the two cities and no fares. The cities of Anacortes, La Conner, and Sedro-Wollley were annexed into the Skagit Transit service area in 1994, followed by Bayview and Concrete in 1995.

Service was cut after the passage of Initiative 695 in 2000, and voters rejected a sales tax increase to support restored service. Skagit Transit began operating inter-county routes to Island and Whatcom counties in 2005, and expanded with a Mount Vernon–Everett commuter route in 2006 part-funded by Island Transit and the state government. The agency also took ownership of Skagit Station in Mount Vernon, which is served by Amtrak Cascades and Island Transit. A 0.2 percent sales tax increase was approved by voters in the November 2008 election, allowing for expanded service.

Facilities

Skagit Station

Address: 105 E. Kincaid St, Mount Vernon, WA. 
Coordinates: 
Facilities: A multimodal station serviced by Greyhound, Amtrak Cascades, Bellingham Connector (Whatcom Transportation Authority), Island Connector (Island Transit) and Everett Express which connects with Sounder commuter rail in Everett.

MOA Building
Address: 600 County Shop Lane, Burlington, WA.
Coordinates: 
Facilities: Maintenance, Operations, Administration

Fares

Fare is due at time of boarding the bus. Fare is one way with no transfers -- Standard Fare is $1.00 one way -- Youth Fare is $0.50 one way -- Reduced Fare is $0.50 one way -- Passes include: -- One-Day Pass (local routes only) $3.00 regular fare - $1.50 youth or reduced fare -- 31-Day Pass (local routes only) $30.00 regular fare - $15.00 youth or reduced fare -- County Connector One-Day Pass (good on all routes) $6.00 regular fare - $3.00 you or reduced fare -- County Connector 31-Day Pass (good on ALL routes) $50.00 regular - $25.00 youth or reduced fare -- No fare refunds - No change is provided -- Fare collection is cash on board the coach or use of the Umo app on mobile devices.

Bus routes

Local routes
As of the January 2022 service.

Route 202 - Skagit Station/South MV Park & Ride
Route 204 - Skagit Station to Skagit Valley College
Route 205 - Skagit Valley College to Skagit Station
Route 206 - Skagit Station to Skagit Valley Hospital via Mount Baker Middle School
Route 207 - Skagit Station to Walmart to Skagit Valley College
Route 208 - Skagit Station to Chuckanut Park & Ride Burlington, Washington
Route 300 - Chuckanut Park & Ride to Sedro Woolley Park and Ride to Job Corps Sedro Woolley
Route 305 - Skagit Valley College to Sedro-Woolley via Clear Lake, Wa
Route 409 - 10th & Q Street to Island Hospital
Route 410 - March's Point Park & Ride to Washington State Ferry Anacortes, Wa
Route 513 - Skagit Station to Anacortes, via Skagit Regional Airport
Route 615 - La Conner to Mount Vernon
Route 717 - Concrete Park and Ride to Cape Horn to Cedar Grove
Route 40X - Skagit Station Mount Vernon, Washington to March's Point Park and Ride Anacortes, Washington
Route 70X - Skagit Station Mount Vernon, Washington to Concrete Park and Ride Concrete, Washington

County Connector Routes
Bellingham Connector (Route 80X) - Mount Vernon to Bellingham
Everett Connector (Route 90X)- Burlington to Everett Station, via Mount Vernon

References

External links

 

Bus transportation in Washington (state)
Transportation in Skagit County, Washington
Transit agencies in Washington (state)